John O'Loughlin may refer to:
 John O'Loughlin (dual player) (born 1989), Irish Gaelic footballer and hurler from County Laois
 John Patrick O'Loughlin (1911–1985), bishop of the Roman Catholic Diocese of Darwin
 Jack O'Loughlin (Australian footballer) (John Joseph O'Loughlin; 1873–1960), Australian rules footballer

See also
 John Loughlin (disambiguation)